Lontov is a village and municipality in the Levice District in the Nitra Region of Slovakia.

History
In historical records the village was first mentioned in 1286.

Geography
The village lies at an altitude of 196 metres and covers an area of 17.197 km². It has a population of about 980 people.

Ethnicity
The village is approximately 72% Hungarian, 25% Slovak, 2% Gypsy and 1% Czech.

Facilities
The village has a public library and football pitch.

External links
https://web.archive.org/web/20070427022352/http://www.statistics.sk/mosmis/eng/run.html
http://www.lontov-lonto.szm.sk

Villages and municipalities in Levice District